Louis Hellman  (born 1936) is a British architect and cartoonist. He is particularly known for his cartoons from the world of architecture and his Archi-têtes drawings, in which he caricatured architects by drawing them in the style of their buildings. His drawings and illustrations have been published in numerous newspapers and magazines since 1967.

Life 
Hellman studied architecture at the "Bartlett School of Architecture" of University College London and at the École des Beaux-Arts in Paris. He is a member of the Royal Institute of British Architects. In 1993 he was made a Member of the Order of the British Empire (MBE).

Exhibitions 
1979 Architectural Association (AA), United Kingdom
1991, 1993: Interbuild, United Kingdom
1996: Cambridge, United Kingdom
2000: Soane-Museum
2001: Barcelona, Spain

Publications 
Architecture A to Z. A Rough Guide. Wiley, Chichester, 2001  .
Architecture for Beginners. Rowohlt paperback publisher, Reinbek, 1988, 
Archi-têtes The ID in the Grid. Wiley, Chichester, 2000  .
'All Hellman breaks loose'

References

External links 
Homepage

Living people
1936 births
British architects
Members of the Order of the British Empire
British cartoonists
Alumni of The Bartlett
École des Beaux-Arts alumni